The Topolog Viaduct is a viaduct east of Râmnicu Vâlcea over the river Topolog. The bridge was opened in 1989.

The viaduct is 1,440 m in length; it has a main height of around 50 m, being constructed out of reinforced concrete.

External links 

  Description

Bridges completed in 1989
Buildings and structures in Vâlcea County
Concrete bridges
Railway bridges in Romania
Viaducts in Romania